KDUA-LP (96.5 FM) is a radio station licensed to serve Rogers, Arkansas.  The station is owned by the St. Anthony of Padua Educational Association. It airs a Catholic radio format.

The station was assigned the KDUA-LP call letters by the Federal Communications Commission on February 12, 2004.

Programming
The station derives a portion of its programming from the EWTN Radio Network. The station is an affiliate of the Relevant Radio Network.

References

External links
 
KDUA-LP service area per the FCC database

Catholic radio stations
DUA-LP
Benton County, Arkansas
Radio stations established in 2004
DUA-LP